Lady from Louisiana is a 1941 American Western film starring John Wayne and Ona Munson. It was produced and directed by Bernard Vorhaus.
The Louisiana State Lottery Company organizes a lottery in 1890s New Orleans, with lottery funds used to finance the local hospitals. However, a company official is the secret head of a protection racket which systematically murders the lottery winners. The protection racket has placed informers in the office of the State Attorney, and has bribed city officials and judges. As a new state attorney tries to combat rampant corruption, the city floods due to torrential rains.

Plot
Yankee lawyer John Reynolds and Southern Belle Julie Mirbeau meet and fall in love on a riverboat going to New Orleans in the Gay Nineties. Upon arrival they are met by Julie's father who runs the popular Louisiana State Lottery Company and Reynold's Aunt Blanche who is a key figure in the anti-lottery forces hoping Reynolds, as State's Attorney, will end the lottery.

Reynolds is invited to the Mirbeau mansion, where Julie and her father explain that not only are the people of New Orleans fun-loving gamblers, but the lottery funds many charitable institutions such as hospitals and levees for the river.

Unknown to General Mirbeau is his assistant Blackie's protection rackets and murders of lottery winners through his army of thugs led by Cuffy Brown. The lottery forces also have information sources in the State's Attorney's office that reveals every move Reynolds has planned to raid illegal activities as well as corrupting judges and other officials through their brothels.

The battle between the two forces escalates, leading to a climax of lightning striking and destroying a courthouse where a trial is going on and a break in the levees during torrential rains that flood the city.

Cast
 John Wayne as John Reynolds
 Ona Munson as Julie Mirbeau
 Ray Middleton as Blackburn "Blackie" Williams
 Henry Stephenson as General Anatole Mirbeau
 Helen Westley as Blanche Brunot
 Jack Pennick as Cuffy Brown
 Dorothy Dandridge as Felice
 Shimen Ruskin as Gaston
 Jacqueline Dalya as Pearl
 Paul Scardon as Judge Wilson
 James H. McNamara as Senator Cassidy (as Major James H. McNamara)
 James C. Morton as Littlefield
 Maurice Costello as Edwards

Production
Republic Pictures spared no expense in making the film, with large numbers of costumed extras and recreations of Mardi Gras. The studio's high standard of action scenes and special effects miniatures come to the fore in the fight scenes and flood climax. The film mixes the romance and action with a comedic touch, with Wayne performing a light, Walking Tall type scenario. A 1941 Time magazine review noted the similarities between Wayne's Thomas E. Dewey type character and Huey Long.

See also
 John Wayne filmography

References

External links
 
 
 
 

1941 films
1941 Western (genre) films
1941 comedy films
1941 drama films
1940s Western (genre) comedy films
American Western (genre) comedy films
American disaster films
American black-and-white films
Films directed by Bernard Vorhaus
Films set in New Orleans
Films set in the 1890s
Republic Pictures films
1940s English-language films
1940s American films
Films with screenplays by Francis Edward Faragoh
Films set in country houses
American films about gambling
Films about corruption in the United States
Films about organized crime in the United States
Flood films